Iakiv (or Yakiv) Mykhailovych Khammo (born 11 June 1994) is an Assyrian-Ukrainian judoka. He is the 2015 World bronze medalist in the +100 kg category and competed at the 2016 Summer Olympics.

In 2021, he won one of the bronze medals in his event at the Judo World Masters held in Doha, Qatar.

References

External links

 
 
 
 
 

1994 births
Living people
Sportspeople from Donetsk Oblast
Ukrainian male judoka
Olympic judoka of Ukraine
Judoka at the 2015 European Games
Judoka at the 2016 Summer Olympics
European Games medalists in judo
European Games bronze medalists for Ukraine
Judoka at the 2019 European Games
Ukrainian people of Assyrian descent
Judoka at the 2020 Summer Olympics
20th-century Ukrainian people
21st-century Ukrainian people